Turritella marianopsis is a species of sea snail, a marine gastropod mollusk in the family Turritellidae.

Distribution

Description 
The maximum recorded shell length is 58 mm.

Habitat 
Minimum recorded depth is 65 m. Maximum recorded depth is 65 m.

References

External links

Turritellidae
Gastropods described in 1990